Niederaussem Power Station is a lignite-fired power station in the Bergheim Niederaussem/Rhein Erft circle, owned by RWE. It consists of nine units, which were built between 1963 and 2003. It is the second-largest lignite coal power plant in operation in Germany, with total output capacity of 3,864 MW and a net capacity of 3,396 MW. The plant is estimated to have been one of the ten most carbon polluting coal-fired power plants in the world in 2018, at 27.2 million tons of carbon dioxide, and its emissions intensity (kgCO2 per MWh of power produced) is estimated to be 45.1% higher relative to the average for all fossil-fueled plants in Germany. According to the study Dirty Thirty, issued in 2007 by the WWF, Niederaussem Power Station is the second worst power station in Europe  in terms of mercury emissions due to the use of lignite.

History

Initial construction

In the autumn of 1960 the construction work for the blocks A and B (150 MW) began. The location was selected because of the possibility of an extension. The supply of brown coal was ensured by seams on a north-south course ("Garzweiler"). Before blocks A and B first produced power, the construction work for the first 300 megawatt power station block location in Niederaussem began. That block went on-line in the summer 1965. Between 1968 and 1971 three further power plants with improved technology were developed. With the building of the two 600 MW plants a large jump forward occurred. These plants were added to the grid in 1974. At that time the plants at Niederaussem produced a total of 2,700 megawatts.

Mid-1990s
In the middle of the 1990s the output was again increased. In order to reach the limit values of the new environmental protection regulations, in 1986 the work for a flue gas desulphurating plant began. That work was completed in 1988. The flue gases are fed into scrubbers and cleaned by a lime water mixture. The cleaned and cooled exhaust gases are then warmed up to 75 °C (167 °F) again and carried by the chimneys to the outside air. During the flue gas purification, gypsum from the lime water mixture, which is processed beside the power station in Auenheim by the company Pro mineral, is produced.

1997 to present
With the building of the block brown coal power station with optimized equipment technology (BoA) a new chapter at the power station began; between 1997 and 2002 it was the most modern brown coal power station block of the world with a gross achievement of 1,012 megawatts (950 MW net) developed with a far higher efficiency (43%) than the other plants (as low as 31%). RWE invested €1,200 million into the project. The new power station block building has a height of 172 metres (564 feet) and is the tallest industrial buildings in the world. The stations cooling towers were also were the tallest in the world at 200 metres (656 feet) but are now the second tallest to those at the Kalisindh Thermal Power Station. By these developments Niederaussem became one of the largest and most modern coal-fired power stations in the world. The official opening of the new block took place in summer 2002. In the presence of Wolfgang Clement, the then North Rhine-Westphalia Prime Minister, and Gerhard Schroeder, the then Federal Chancellor, the new power station went on to the grid.

Since 21 July 2006 RWE has spent €40 million building a fluidized bed drying unit with waste heat technology (WTA) as a pilot project for the drying process of the raw brown coal. In addition the free waste heat of the power station is used. It is hoped that in the next few decades the overall efficiency of electricity production by brown coal can be increased to 50%.

In 2019, RWE cancelled a 1,200 MW upgrade.

2006 fire

An incident in the power station Niederaussem occurred on 9 June 2006. At 1:15 a fire caught hold in block H of the coaling station. The fire spread to two further coaling station blocks. Later the flames seized nearly the entire area of the "old power station", and a large, black smoke cloud ascended, which spread many kilometres to the north-west. The power station's own fire brigade could not control the fire and sounded the alarm. About 300 rescue forces from the entire Land responded. The damage to property went into the two digit million-range.  Even by the late evening of the next day the fire was not completely extinguished. The spread of the fire was contained by recently developed fire precautions in the other sectors of the power station so that only the coaling station was affected.

See also
 List of tallest cooling towers
 
 Neurath Power Station

References

External links

 Kraftwerk Niederaußem (de)

Coal-fired power stations in Germany
RWE
1965 establishments in West Germany
Energy infrastructure completed in 1969
Buildings and structures in Rhein-Erft-Kreis